Meterana pansicolor is a species of moth in the family Noctuidae.  It is endemic to New Zealand. This species is classified as "At Risk, Naturally Uncommon" by the Department of Conservation.

Taxonomy 
This species was described by George Howes and named Morrisonia pansicolor in 1912 from specimens collected in Dunedin in November. George Hudson, using the same name, described and illustrated this species in his 1928 book The Butterflies and Moths of New Zealand. In 1988 John S. Dugdale placed this species within the genus Meterana. The lectotype specimen is held at the Museum of New Zealand Te Papa Tongarewa.

Description 

Howes described the species as follows:

Distribution 
This species is endemic to New Zealand. It is only known from Dunedin and Central Otago.

Biology and behaviour
Very little is known about the biology of this species. Adult moths emerge in spring. The adults are on the wing in October and November. The adult moths are attracted to sugar traps.

Host species and habitat 
The larvae of this moth feed on lacebark (Hoheria) species.

Conservation Status 
This species has been classified as having the "At Risk, Naturally Uncommon" conservation status under the New Zealand Threat Classification System.

References

Moths described in 1912
Moths of New Zealand
Hadeninae
Endemic fauna of New Zealand
Endangered biota of New Zealand
Taxa named by George Howes (entomologist)
Endemic moths of New Zealand